The Seattle Seahawks joined the National Football League (NFL) in 1976 with the Tampa Bay Buccaneers.  They participated in their first draft, the 1976 NFL draft and selected Steve Niehaus, a defensive tackle from Notre Dame. The team's most recent first-round selection was in 2022, when they chose Charles Cross, an offensive tackle. 

Every year during April, each NFL franchise seeks to add new players to its roster through a collegiate draft known as "the NFL Annual Player Selection Meeting", which is more commonly known as the NFL Draft. Teams are ranked in inverse order based on the previous season's record, with the worst record picking first, and the second worst picking second and so on. The two exceptions to this order are made for teams that appeared in the previous Super Bowl; the Super Bowl champion always picks 32nd, and the Super Bowl loser always picks 31st. Teams have the option of trading away their picks to other teams for different picks, players, cash, or a combination thereof.  Thus, it is not uncommon for a team's actual draft pick to differ from their assigned draft pick, or for a team to have extra or no draft picks in any round due to these trades.

The Seahawks have never selected the number one overall pick in any draft, although they have selected the second overall pick twice, the third overall pick three times and the fourth overall pick twice.  The team's three selections from Notre Dame are the most chosen by the Seahawks from one university.

Key

Player selections

Footnotes

References 
 
 

Seattle Seahawks

first-round draft picks